Alan Rodríguez may refer to:
 Alan Rodríguez (Mexican footballer) (born 1996), Mexican football midfielder
 Alan Rodríguez (Uruguayan footballer) (born 2000), Uruguayan football midfielder